Anapia District is one of seven districts of the province Yunguyo in Puno Region, Peru.

History 
Anapia District was created by Law No. 236062 (18, 1983), in second term of Fernando Belaúnde Terry.

Authorities

Mayors 
 2011-2014: Francisco Limachi Froilán Escobar. 
 2007-2010: José Fabián Flores Velasco.

See also 
 Administrative divisions of Peru

References

External links 

 INEI Perú